HotCha may refer to:

 Hotcha Trio, a former harmonica ensemble from the Netherlands
 HotCha, a former Hong Kong cantopop trio group
 Hotcha Girls, a song from the 2002 album Sharpen Your Teeth by Ugly Casanova
 HotChaCha, a Cleveland-based art punk band
 Hotcha (company), a UK take-away restaurant chain that serves Chinese cuisine